Aasheervaadam is a 1977 Indian Malayalam-language film, directed by I. V. Sasi and produced by Thayyil Kunjikandan. The film was written by Alleppey Sheriff. The film stars Kamal Haasan, Sridevi, Sheela, K. P. Ummer and Bahadoor. The film has musical score by M. K. Arjunan.

Cast 
Kamal Haasan(Dubbed by Chandramohan)
Sridevi(Dubbed by Lissi)
Sheela
Bahadoor
K. P. Ummer
M. G. Soman
Jayan
Vidhubala
Ravikumar

Soundtrack 

The music was composed by M. K. Arjunan and the lyrics were written by Bharanikkavu Sivakumar.

Release 

References

External links 
 

1977 films
1970s Malayalam-language films
Films directed by I. V. Sasi